Coleophora rostrata is a moth of the family Coleophoridae.

References

rostrata
Moths described in 1994